Harpa harpa, common name the true harp or the noble harp, is a species of sea snail, a marine gastropod mollusk in the family Harpidae, the harp snails.

Description
The size of the shell varies between 40 mm and 110 mm.

The ovate shell is a little ventricose. The spire is slightly elongated and submuricated. The 12 to 14 whorls are flattened above, surmounted by ribs which are continued. The whorls become broader as they approach the lip. They are ornamented with transverse black lines, dividing them into unequal spaces, the coloring of which is less deep than that of the interstices of the ribs. The ribs are of a grayish or brown tint, of little variety, with wide spots, which sometimes form bands of a bloody purple. There are undulating lines in zigzags or white festoons, and brown meanderings between them. There are ovate, short sharp spines on shoulder. The upper band of the body whorl often becomes more apparent from the brightened or even whitish shade of its color. The ovate aperture is of an orange white. The outer lip is marked by brown spots internally, and bordered externally by the last rib which is denticulated in a portion of its length. The columella is slightly arched at the base, almost covered in its length by three very distant violet or brown spots.

Distribution
This species occurs in the Red Sea and in the Indian Ocean off Chagos, the Comores, Djibouti, Eritrea, Kenya, Madagascar, Mauritius, Mozambique, Réunion, the Seychelles, Somalia and Tanzania; in the Western Pacific to Hawaii; also off Okinawa and Australia (Northern Territory, Queensland, Western Australia).

References

 Linnaeus, C. 1758. Systemae naturae per regna tria naturae, secundum classes, ordines, genera, species, cum characteribus, differetiis, synonymis, locis.v. Holmiae : Laurentii Salvii 824 pp.
 Röding, P.F. 1798. Museum Boltenianum sive Catalogus cimeliorum e tribus regnis naturae quae olim collegerat Joa. Hamburg : Trappii 199 pp. 
 Link, H.F. 1807. Beschreibung der Naturalien Sammlung der Universität zu Rostock. Rostock : Alders Erben.
 Dautzenberg, Ph. (1929). Contribution à l'étude de la faune de Madagascar: Mollusca marina testacea. Faune des colonies françaises, III(fasc. 4). Société d'Editions géographiques, maritimes et coloniales: Paris. 321–636, plates IV-VII pp.
 Hinton, A. 1972. Shells of New Guinea and the Central Indo-Pacific. Milton : Jacaranda Press xviii 94 pp. 
 Rehder H.A. (1973). The family Harpidae of the world. Indo-Pacific Mollusca 3(16) : 207–274
 Kay, E.A. 1979. Hawaiian Marine Shells. Reef and shore fauna of Hawaii. Section 4 : Mollusca. Honolulu, Hawaii : Bishop Museum Press Bernice P. Bishop Museum Special Publication Vol. 64(4) 653 pp.
 Walls, J.G. (1980). Conchs, tibias and harps. A survey of the molluscan families Strombidae and Harpidae. T.F.H. Publications Ltd, Hong Kong
 Wilson, B. 1994. Australian Marine Shells. Prosobranch Gastropods. Kallaroo, WA : Odyssey Publishing Vol. 2 370 pp. 
 Dance, S.P. & G.T. Poppe, 1999 Family Harpidae. In : A Conchological Iconography (ConchBooks, ed.), 69 p.

External links
 

Harpidae
Gastropods described in 1758
Taxa named by Carl Linnaeus